Jhapat Bahadur Rawal() is a Nepalese Politician who served as the Member of House of Representatives elected from Kailali 2 (constituency). He is  Central Committee Member of  the CPN (UML).

Electoral history 
He has been elected to the Member of House of Representatives from Kailali 2.

2017 legislative elections

2022 Nepalese general election

He lost 2022 Nepalese general election from Kailali 2.

See also 
 Nepal Communist Party
 Kailali District
 Kailali 2 (constituency)

References

Living people
People from Achham District
1975 births
Nepal MPs 2017–2022
Nepal Communist Party (NCP) politicians
Communist Party of Nepal (Unified Marxist–Leninist) politicians